Punk Farm is a children's book by Jarrett J. Krosoczka, published on April 26, 2005, by Knopf Books for Young Readers. Soensha, a Japanese publisher, plans on publishing a Japanese edition of the book. A sequel book, Punk Farm on Tour, was released on October 9, 2007.

A theatrical film adaptation based on the book is in the works by Metro-Goldwyn-Mayer.

Plot introduction
Punk Farm tells the story of five farm animals—Sheep (lead vocals), Pig (electric guitar and backing vocals), Goat (electric bass guitar and backing vocals), Chicken (electronic musical keyboards and backing vocals) and Cow (drum kit and backing vocals)—who are an underground punk rock band called "Punk Farm". They perform a punk rock cover of "Old MacDonald Had a Farm" while Farmer Joe is asleep.

Awards and nominations
The book was one of Child Magazine's "Best Books of the Year" in 2005.
It was also a Texas 2 by 2 Reading List Book and a Miami Herald "Best Book of the Year"
It was recommended by NY1, The Boston Globe, the Seattle Post-Intelligencer,  The Wichita Eagle, and The Associated Press.
It received a starred review by Kirkus Reviews.
Punk Farm has also been nominated for the following state awards:
WEMTA Golden Archer Award, Wisconsin's state book award
Mitten Award, Michigan's state book award
Volunteer State Book Award, Tennessee's state award

Film adaptations
In April 2006, DreamWorks Animation had the rights to develop a computer animated film adaptation. It would have been produced by Kevin Messick and written by Jim Hecht, both of whom developed its story.

In June 2011, Metro-Goldwyn-Mayer later announced that it was developing a computer-animated film based on the book. David Silverman, the director of The Simpsons Movie and co-director of Monsters, Inc., would direct the feature and Prana Studios will be handling the animation. As of May 2020, the film remains in development hell.

References

External links
Jarrett J. Krosoczka's official site
 Random House page
Amazon.com entry
Characters' home at MySpace.com
 

2005 children's books
American picture books
Alfred A. Knopf books